The Order of the Band, Knights of the Band, or Equites Bindae, was a military order in Spain, instituted by Alfonso XI, King of Castile in 1332. It took its name from the banda, band, sash or red ribbon which was once worn by knights belonging to the order.

Membership of the order was awarded to certain distinguished knights and squires of the king, and had roots back as far as 1324. This order was only for nobility; the eldest sons of grandees were excluded; and a prerequisite to admittance was to have served at least ten years either in the army, or at court. They were bound to take up arms for Catholicism against infidels. The King himself was Grand Master of the order. After a period of decline it is considered to have been extinct by 1474.

See also 
Female order of the Band
Royal Bend of Castile

References

External links
Members of the Order of the Band

Band
Orders of chivalry of Spain
14th-century establishments in Castile
History of Catholicism in Spain
Catholic orders of chivalry
1332 establishments in Europe